Giordano Colausig (born December 16, 1940 in Gradisca d'Isonzo) is a retired Italian professional football player. 

He played for 7 seasons (89 games, 7 goals) in the Serie A for L.R. Vicenza, A.S. Roma and Brescia Calcio.

External links
 Giordano  Colausig.

1940 births
Living people
Italian footballers
Serie A players
L.R. Vicenza players
A.S. Roma players
Brescia Calcio players
Genoa C.F.C. players
A.C. Perugia Calcio players

Association football midfielders